Yoko Kanno produce Cyber Bicci  is a compilation album of Japanese composer Yoko Kanno and Italian vocalist Ilaria Graziano under her stage name ILA. The album includes their collaborated works for anime soundtracks, along with two new tracks.

Track listing

Charts

References

External links
JVC site

2011 albums
Albums produced by Yoko Kanno
Victor Entertainment albums